Mohamed Saïd Benrahma (born 10 August 1995) is an Algerian professional footballer who plays as a left winger for Premier League club West Ham United and the Algeria national team.

Benrahma began his professional career with Nice, later spending time on loan with Angers, Gazélec Ajaccio and Châteauroux during his early career. He came to prominence in the EFL Championship after a move to Brentford in 2018, scoring 27 goals in 83 appearances for the West London outfit before moving to the Premier League with West Ham on a permanent basis following a loan spell in 2021.

Club career

Nice
A winger, Benrahma began his youth career with Algerian club NRB Bethioua, before moving to France and joining Balma SC, Colomiers and then Ligue 1 club Nice in 2013. He made his professional debut under manager Claude Puel during the 2013–14 season, but played most of his football for the club with the reserve team, for whom he made 37 appearances and scored 11 goals between 2013 and 2016. Benrahma scored one goal in his three first team appearances during the 2014–15 season and scored a further two in 2015–16.

Ankle injuries and the arrival of manager Lucien Favre led to Benrahma spending a large portion of his latter career with the club away on loan, at Ligue 1 club Angers and Ligue 2 clubs Gazélec Ajaccio and Châteauroux. Benrahma departed the Stade de Nice in July 2018, having made 18 appearances and scored three goals during his time with the club.

Brentford
On 6 July 2018, Benrahma moved to England to join Championship club Brentford on a four-year contract, with the option of a further year, for an undisclosed fee, reported to be £2.7 million. He scored his first goal for the club on his third appearance, in a 4–2 EFL Cup first round victory over Southend United on 14 August 2018. Six weeks later, Benrahma was sent off for the first time in his Bees career after committing two bookable offences during a 2–2 draw with Reading on 29 September. After returning from injury in December, Benrahma broke into the starting lineup and came into form in mid-January 2019, scoring nine goals in 14 league matches. He was nominated for the January and February PFA Fans' Player of the Month awards and one of his three goals in a 5–1 win over Hull City was chosen as the Championship Goal of the Month for February and as Brentford's Goal of the Season. An ankle injury suffered in early April 2019 ended Benrahma's season, by which time he had made 45 appearances and scored 11 goals.

Benrahma missed Brentford's entire 2019–20 pre-season match programme and returned to competitive play in mid-August 2019, before breaking back into the starting lineup late in the month. During a 2019–20 season in which his performances led to him being voted the Brentford Supporters' Player of the Year and named in the Championship PFA Team of the Year, Benrahma made 46 appearances and scored 17 goals, which included two hat-tricks. His performances during Brentford's run to the 2020 Championship play-off Final saw him win the January 2020 PFA Fans' Player of the Month and the July 2020 Championship Player of the Month awards. In addition, he was nominated for the 2020 London Football Awards EFL Player of the Year award and the 2019–20 PFA Fans' Championship Player of the Year award.

After a second consecutive pre-season of transfer speculation, Benrahma was left out of head coach Thomas Frank's matchday squads early in the 2020–21 regular season, before making his first appearance of the season as a substitute for Sergi Canós after 73 minutes of a 1–1 draw with Millwall on 26 September 2020. He started the following match versus West London rivals Fulham in the EFL Cup and his performance and second goal in the 3–0 fourth round victory was recognised with the man of the match and Goal of the Round awards respectively.

West Ham United
On 16 October 2020, Benrahma joined Premier League club West Ham United on an initial season-long loan deal, with an agreement to make the transfer permanent. On 31 October, he came off the bench and made his debut in a 2–1 loss against Liverpool in a league fixture. He was named in the starting 11 for the first time in a 2–1 win over Leeds United on 11 December.

On 29 January 2021, the loan deal was terminated early as West Ham signed Benrahma on a permanent contract in order to free up a domestic loan space for the incoming Jesse Lingard. The club agreed to pay £25 million plus £5 million in add-ons. The transfer fee made Benrahma West Ham’s third most expensive player behind Sébastien Haller and Felipe Anderson. On 15 May 2021, Benrahma scored his first goal for West Ham in a 1–1 away league draw against Brighton & Hove Albion.

International career
In September 2015, Benrahma was called up to the Algeria national team for friendly matches against Guinea and Senegal. He made his debut in the match versus Senegal on 13 October 2015, when he came on as a substitute for Baghdad Bounedjah after 70 minutes of the 1–0 victory. One month later, Benrahma was called into the squad for two 2018 World Cup second round qualifiers versus Tanzania, but did not make an appearance. Benrahma's club form at Brentford during the 2018–19 season was recognised with a call-up for two 2019 Africa Cup of Nations qualifiers and he won his second international cap with a start in a 1–0 win over Tunisia on 26 March 2019. He was named in Algeria's preliminary squad for the 2019 Africa Cup of Nations, but was forced to withdraw due to injury.

Benrahma scored his first international goal in a 4–0 away win against Djibouti on 12 November 2021 in the 2022 FIFA World Cup qualifiers.
He was named in Algeria’s squad for the 2021 Africa Cup of Nations.

Personal life
Benrahma was born in Aïn Témouchent and grew up in Sidi Bel Abbès. He moved to Toulouse, France with his parents at the age of 11 and holds a French passport. Benrahma's father died in January 2020 and he publicly dedicated each of his subsequent five goals to him.

Career statistics

Club

International

Scores and results list Algeria'a goal tally first, score column indicates score after each Benrahma goal.

Honours 
Individual
 PFA Fans' Player of the Month: January 2020
 EFL Championship Player of the Month: July 2020
 Brentford Supporters' Player of the Year: 2019–20
 Championship PFA Team of the Year: 2019–20

References

External links
 Saïd Benrahma at West Ham United F.C. (archive)
 
 
 
 

1995 births
Living people
People from Aïn Témouchent
Association football wingers
Association football forwards
Algerian footballers
Algeria international footballers
Naturalized citizens of France
Balma SC players
US Colomiers Football players
OGC Nice players
Angers SCO players
Gazélec Ajaccio players
LB Châteauroux players
Brentford F.C. players
Ligue 1 players
Ligue 2 players
Championnat National 2 players
Algerian expatriate footballers
Algerian emigrants to France
Algerian expatriate sportspeople in England
Expatriate footballers in England
English Football League players
West Ham United F.C. players
Premier League players
2021 Africa Cup of Nations players